Raúl Osiel Marroquín Reyes (born September 1, 1980), also known as El Sádico, is a Mexican kidnapper and serial killer responsible for six kidnappings, four of which ended in murder, in Mexico City.

He was an organized killer, motivated by hate and discrimination. All his victims were homosexual men, for which he has become a symbol for homophobia in Mexico.

Life before the crimes
Born to parents Roberto Marroquín and Gloria Reyes, Raúl spent one year as a military doctor and was a member of the Mexican army for four years, holding the rank of First Sergeant, but was then discharged.

He was admitted as a private soldier on January 21, 1999, enrolling in the 15th Infantry Battalion in his hometown, where he reached the rank of Second Sergeant. Raúl wanted to advance in the militia and study medicine, but the lack of financial resources forced him to resign. In May 2004, he was discharged from the army and returned to Tampico, where he was eventually imprisoned for 14 months because of a violent robbery.

Victims

Modus operandi
Marroquín would approach his victims (whom he met at a famous gay bar, the Cabaretito Neón, located in Zona Rosa, Col. Juárez, Cuauhtémoc delegation of Mexico City), with sentimental and/or erotic proposals; he invited them to his house located at 4223 Av. Andrés Molina Enríquez, Col. Asturias, Venustiano Carranza delegation, or to a hotel; where, depending on whether he had the economic resources, would kidnap them or not. He was aided by accomplice Juan Enrique Madrid Manuel.

He would torture his victims (hence his nickname) by suffocating them until they lost consciousness, and once they returned to their senses Marroquín would suffocate them again and again, until he finally killed them.

When he asked the victim's relatives to help their loved one, regardless of whether they paid or not, Raúl would murder his hostage either by suffocation or strangulation. Later, he left the corpses, which were in suitcases, around different parts of the city.

Murdered
Jonathan Razo Ayala was kidnapped on October 27, 2005 and murdered on November 12, after 16 days in Marroquin's house. He requested $5,000 ransom, but the victim's family could not pay.
Ricardo López Hernández was kidnapped on November 30, 2005. He was held captive for nine days until December 9 when he was murdered by strangulation after Marroquin had taken just over $2,000 ransom.
Armando Rivas Pérez was kidnapped on December 16, 2005. That same day, even though his ransom was paid, he was murdered.
Víctor Ángel Iván Gutiérrez Balderas was abducted the same day as Armando Rivas and held hostage for six days. After a ransom of a little over $800, he was killed on December 22.

Kidnapped
Juan Carlos Alfaro Alba: was the first victim of Marroquín, kidnapped on October 21, 2005. He was held captive for about a week in a hotel room, during which he received serious physical and psychological damage. His kidnapper asked the family for a ransom, who paid as quickly as possible; Raúl Marroquín then left his victim tied up in the hotel room, apparently because he hadn't "evolved" yet, settling only for the violence inflicted and the easily earned money, sparing Alfaro's life.
José Ricardo Galindo Valdés: the penultimate victim was kidnapped by Marroquin on December 13, 2005. Raúl communicated with the scared mother, who implored him to not hurt her son, as the family had no money to pay off the ransom. Perhaps because he had a moral dilemma -  the murderer let Galindo leave, but not before threatening to kill him if he spoke about it.

Psychiatric profile
His crimes had many similarities to those of the American homosexual serial killers John Wayne Gacy and Robert Berdella the motive being a little different: Gacy murdered his victims due to a repression of his own homosexuality that he projected towards others (he was attracted to them, which he blamed them for) and Berdella to vent his frustration on his victims. In contrast, Marroquín, although his crimes also had marked homoerotic features (Marroquín himself declared not to be homosexual), you can see in him a sociopath or psychopath within a socio-cultural framework that, in one way or another, gave him a showcase for its contained violence, directing it towards a minority.

After his arrest, Marroquín would declare not to be homophobic (although this assertion would be contradicted by others made by the homicide, in which he refers to homosexuals as "an evil for society") that the main reason homosexual men were his target victims was because these people were easier to hunt; This was the statement he made when questioned about his employer:

"... because I did not fight in operations that involved weapons and vehicles, it was enough to go to the places they frequented and they alone approached me, it was easier for me to treat those victims".

He lacked empathy and reified the people around him. After being arrested, he was asked if he did not feel bad for the relatives of the people he murdered (since he had obviously taken all human value from his victims), he replied, "I have never thought about them".

He was reluctant to submit to social norms and this made him prone to deviation and criminality.
He lacked guilt and did not accept responsibility for his actions.
He rationalized his actions and possessed an inflated self-esteem. The clearest example of this was to express that their crimes were a good for society, "I even did a good to the society, because those people make that I spent my childhood..."

«One of my victims was a carrier of HIV, and in a certain way, prevented the spread of the virus ...»

He who justified his actions as correct tells us of his inflated self-esteem, he saw himself as a benefactor of society (an exterminating angel). This also indicates an over-evaluation of oneself (narcissism), which is indicative of a deficient psycho-sexual development and an immaturity of the psycho-affective development; according to Robert D. Keppel and William J. Birnes, a psycho-affective development disorder is the main cause of the behavior of a serial killer.

These statements also speak of a distancing from reality. He believed that his actions had a moral justification, although he was fully aware of the ethical and legal implications of his actions, he thought that for society his crimes were minor and even justifiable. According to Joel Norris, this process (the distancing of reality) corresponds to the first phase of the behavior of a serial killer.

He was prone to sexual perversions.
He felt attracted and was in constant search of strong emotions; What also, together with the absence of empathy, self-centeredness and the inability to accept responsibility for his actions, made him prone to deviation, crime and paraphilias.
He was a megalomaniac. His pathological attraction is clearly seen in the torture he subjected to his victims: by torturing he seeks to break the will of the individual to deprive him of his human quality, and thus to have absolute power over that person.
He was charismatic, attractive and manipulative.
He was violent and suffered from explosions of anger.
He had a parasitic lifestyle.
His criminal career started him as an assailant, his motivation was monetary (his constant search for intense emotions and his pathological attraction for power (megalomania), were also triggers for his criminal behavior); Later, in the same way motivated by the same factors, it evolved to kidnapping, Marroquin was one of the many people in Mexico who saw in the kidnapping a very lucrative activity (because in many of the cases he had already collected the ransom money before assassinating to his victim), and finally to murder. As a result of his activity as a kidnapper he obtained a total of 109 thousand pesos (just over 10,000 dollars).

Motive
Explaining himself, Marroquín said, "I snuffed out four homosexuals that in some way were affecting society." He also says he chose gays as his victims because "they're a bad example for kids".

Capture and sentence
He was arrested by the PGR on January 23, 2006 in Mexico City without his accomplice, who was captured in 2013. While Raúl Marroquín was sentenced to 128 years imprisonment on September 4, 2008, he stated after his arrest:

On September 4, 2008, Marroquín and Manuel de Madrid were sentenced to a total of almost 300 years in prison. He is currently serving his sentence in the Santa Martha Acatitla Penitentiary in Mexico City, to which he was transferred in 2010, after having been in the Reclusorio Oriente in Mexico City.

Media
In an interview, Marroquín said he was not ashamed of his crimes, but was sorry for what his family was going through. He declared he had recurring dreams of his criminal career "improving" by selecting richer, more famous victims. He said he would definitely kill again and try to be more careful about his methods, avoiding the mistakes that led to his capture.

See also
Violence against LGBT people
Homosexuality in Mexico
Hate Crime
Homophobia
List of serial killers by country

References

External links
El Universal
365 Gay.com

1981 births
Living people
Male serial killers
Mexican people convicted of murder
Mexican serial killers
People convicted of murder by Mexico
Violence against gay men
Violence against men in North America